The Limited Liability Act 1855 (18 & 19 Vict c 133) was an Act of the Parliament of the United Kingdom that first expressly allowed limited liability for corporations that could be established by the general public in England and Wales as well as Ireland. The Act did not apply to Scotland, where the limited liability of shareholders for the debts company debts had been recognised since the mid-Eighteenth century with the decision in the case of Stevenson v McNair. Although the validity of the decision in that case had come to be doubted by the mid-Nineteenth century, the Joint Stock Companies Act 1856 – which applied across the UK – put the matter beyond doubt, settling that Scottish 'companies' could be possessed of both separate legal personality and limited liability.

Overview
Under the Act, shareholders were still liable directly to creditors, for the unpaid portion of their shares. The modern principle that shareholders are liable to the corporation was introduced by the Joint Stock Companies Act 1844.

The 1855 Act allowed limited liability to companies of more than 25 members (shareholders). Insurance companies were excluded from the act, though it was standard practice for insurance contracts to exclude action against individual members. Limited liability for insurance companies was allowed by the Companies Act 1862.

Debate
In the House of Lords, a considerable amount of opposition existed to the idea that companies should have the advantage of limited liability. Many peers objected to what appeared to them as the government rushing through the bill as if its urgency was connected to the effort in the Crimean War. Earl Grey was one of these. He said,

Earl Granville replied to these concerns as follows.

See also
Companies Act
Companies Act 2006
Joint Stock Companies Act 1844
Joint Stock Companies Act 1856
Utopia, Limited

Bibliography
Gibbons, David. The Limited Liability Act, 18th & 19th Victoria, Cap. 133. John Weale. High Holborn, London. 1855.
Paterson, W (ed). "Limited Liability Act". The Practical Statutes of the Session 1855. John Crockford. Essex Street, Strand, London. Pages 556 to 570.

Notes

http://hansard.millbanksystems.com/lords/1855/aug/07/limited-liability-bill#S3V0139P0_18550807_HOL_4

Public liability
United Kingdom Acts of Parliament 1855
History of corporate law
United Kingdom company law